4. Levent is an underground rapid transit station on the M2 line of the Istanbul Metro. It is located in northern Levent under Büyükdere Avenue in Kâğıthane. The station opened on 16 September 2000 and is one of the original six stations of the M2 line. Between 2000 and 2009 4. Levent was the northern terminus of the line and the tracks north of the station would serve as storage tracks for rolling stock. Connections to İETT bus service are available as İETT operates a large bus hub next to the station. Levent has an island platform serviced by two tracks.

Layout

References

Railway stations opened in 2000
Istanbul metro stations
Şişli
2000 establishments in Turkey